EagleView is a technology provider of aerial imagery, data analytics and geographic information system mapping based in Bellevue, Washington in the Seattle metropolitan area with operations in Rochester, New York. The company was founded by Chris Pershing and Dave Carlson in 2008. EagleView merged with aerial imagery provider Pictometry International in 2013, was acquired by Vista Equity Partners in June 2015 and received additional funding from Clearlake Capital in 2018.

Software and offerings
In 2022, EagleView introduced EagleView Assess™, helping contractors capture complete measurements and roof condition data through the deployment of autonomous drones.

In 2008, EagleView introduced an aerial roof measurement technology, using algorithms to infer size, shape, pitch, and area of the roof.

In 2011, EagleView introduced\, a solar 3D-roofing report for solar integrators and solar installers that estimates solar exposure, rafter lengths, grid layout and overall roof orientation in degrees.

In 2012, EagleView added wall measurement reports that assess damage to siding, walls and windows to its products.

In 2014, EagleView introduced the QuickSquares report and QuickSquares app which allows contractors to create a customized estimate report including an aerial photo of the proposed property to give to the owner before a sale is made.

References

Companies based in Bothell, Washington